Joseph Wall may refer to:
 Joseph Wall (colonial administrator) (1737–1802), soldier, governor of Goree
 Joseph B. Wall (1847–1912), Florida state senator
 Joseph Frazier Wall (1920–1995), American historian
 Jobi Wall (Joseph Wall, born 1989), American basketball player